Back to Nature is a 1936 American comedy film directed by James Tinling and starring Jed Prouty, Shirley Deane and Dixie Dunbar. It is part of the Jones Family series of films.

Cast
 Jed Prouty as Mr. John Jones  
 Shirley Deane as Bonnie Jones  
 Dixie Dunbar as Mabel  
 Tony Martin as Tom Williams  
 Spring Byington as Mrs. Louise Jones  
 Kenneth Howell as Jack Jones  
 George Ernest as Roger Jones  
 June Carlson as Lucy Jones  
 Florence Roberts as Granny Jones  
 Billy Mahan as Bobby Jones  
 Ivan Miller as Federal Officer 
 Oscar Apfel as Hotel Manager  
 James Barton as Motorcycle Officer  
 Spencer Charters as Deputy Sheriff Putney  
 Edgar Dearing as Motorcycle Officer  
 John Webb Dillon as Scotland Yard Man  
 Wesley Giraud as Hitchhiker  
 Russell Simpson as Sheriff 
 Arthur Stone as Boathouse Owner 
 George E. Stone as Mr. Sweeney

References

Bibliography
 Bernard A. Drew. Motion Picture Series and Sequels: A Reference Guide. Routledge, 2013.

External links
 

1936 films
1936 comedy films
American comedy films
Films directed by James Tinling
20th Century Fox films
American black-and-white films
Films scored by Samuel Kaylin
1930s English-language films
1930s American films